Amanda is a novel written by Candice F. Ransom.  It is the first in the Sunfire series of thirty-two books.  It was published by Scholastic Press in 1984, and is 346 pages long.  It is currently an out-of-print book, though the trademark is still held by Scholastic Press.

Plot introduction
The plot of Amanda centers around the main character's journey from Boston to Oregon on the Oregon Trail in 1846.  Amanda Bentley travels with her father Thaddeus Bentley, who is escaping creditors in their former hometown of Boston.  Her beau Joseph White lives in Boston as well.

On the Oregon Trail, she meets and befriends several characters, including Helen Jorgenson, a girl of her own age, and Ben Compton, who becomes a romantic interest as well later in the book.

Amanda's character changes throughout the book, from spoiled society girl to hardworking pioneer woman.

Characters in "Amanda" 
Amanda Bentley – pioneer woman, initially from Boston, Massachusetts
Thaddeus Bentley – her father, running from creditors
Joseph White – Amanda's former romantic interest in Boston
Helen Jorgenson – Amanda's friend on the trail
Ben Compton – Amanda's romantic interest
Serena Hawkins – Ben's childhood friend back in Illinois.  Said to be Ben's fiancée.

Allusions/references to actual history, geography and current science 
Placed during the period of North American history in which settlers travelled west in search of a new life the setting is the Oregon Trail, which travels from the midwest to the Northwest of the United States.

1984 American novels
American historical novels
Fiction set in 1846
Scholastic Corporation books